Common Intention and Common Intention are two critical themes of criminal law in Pakistan.

34.	acts done by a few persons In encouragement of regular proposition.

At the point when a criminal demonstration is carried out by a few persons, in encouragement of the regular proposition of all, every such individual is at risk for that demonstration in the same way as though it were carried out by only him.

141.	unlawful gathering:

A gathering of five or more persons is assigned an "unlawful get together" if the regular object of the persons forming that get together is:

 To overawe by criminal constrain and Common Intention and Common Object, or show of criminal compel, the Federal or any Provincial Government or Legislature, or any open servant in the activity of the legitimate force of such open servant
 To oppose the execution of any law, or of any legitimate methodology
 To perpetrate any evil or criminal trespass, or other offense
 By method for criminal constrain, or show of criminal power, to any individual to take or acquire ownership of any property, or to deny any individual of the satisfaction in a right of manner, or of the utilization of water or other ethereal right of which he is in ownership or happiness, or to implement any right or assumed right; or
 By method for criminal constrain, or show of criminal power, to urge any individual to do what he is not lawfully bound to do, or to discard to do what he is legitimately qualified for do

146.	rioting:

At whatever point power or savagery is utilized by an unlawful gathering, or by any part thereof, in arraignment of the normal object of such get together, every part of such gathering is blameworthy of the offense of revolting.

149.	every part of unlawful gathering liable of offense submitted in indictment of normal item:

In the event that an offense is conferred by any part of an unlawful gathering in indictment of the normal object of that get together, or, for example, the parts of that get together knew to be prone to be submitted in arraignment of that question, each individual who, at the time of the conferring of that offense, is a part of the same get together, is blameworthy of that offense.

Law of Pakistan